Hsueh Shih-ling (born June 10, 1983), also known as Simon Hsueh or MC40, is a Taiwanese actor, singer, rapper, songwriter and television presenter. He is formerly a member of the defunct Taiwanese hip hop band Da Mouth, with DJ Chung Hua, Harry, and Aisa.

Hsueh writes most of Da Mouth's song lyrics and is considered one of the best and fastest rappers in Taiwan with his multi-language rapping ability.

Early life
Hsueh was born on June 10, 1983 in Sanmin District, Kaohsiung and was raised in Vancouver, British Columbia, Canada. He attended Fu Jen Catholic University Department of English, in New Taipei City, Taiwan. He speaks English and Mandarin fluently. He is also known as Simon Hsueh.

Career

2007-2009: Da Mouth debut

Hsueh signed up under Universal Music Taiwan and formed the group, Da Mouth in 2007. The group released their debut self-titled album Da Mouth on November 26, 2007. The album consists of thirteen songs, in which all the songs (with the exception of the three instrumental songs) are penned by Hsueh.

The group received the Best Singing Group at the 19th Golden Melody Awards, which was held in the Taipei Arena on July 5, 2008.

On December 19, 2008, Da Mouth released their second album entitled Wang Yuan Kou Li Kou (王元口力口) under the same company. Once again, the album consists of thirteen songs, and almost all of the songs (with the exception of the two instrumental songs and Harry's solo) are written by Hsueh.

In 2009, Hsueh was featured in Chloe Wang's 哥本哈根的童話 album, and rapped on her single entitled "哥本哈根的童話". In addition, he wrote the songs "D.I.S.C.O" and "怪......不怪" by Yungai Hayung and Sky Wu respectively. He also got his acting debut in Possible Love (愛到底), a drama film.

2010-present: Da Mouth album releases & acting career
Da Mouth's third album,One Two Three (万凸3) was released on January 23, 2010, under Universal Music Taiwan. The album consists of twelve songs, all written by Hsueh, excluding the two instrumental songs. The lead track "喇舌" was listed at number 42 on Hit Fm Taiwan's Hit Fm Annual Top 100 Singles Chart (Hit-Fm年度百首單曲) for 2010.

In the same year, the group released their first New + Best Selections album, Episode (首部曲) on October 8, 2010. The album consists of two disks with eighteen songs overall. The first disk is composed of ten songs from their first three albums plus a remix from those songs named "Episode remix". The second disk, on the other hand, is composed of six new songs, in which Hsueh had his first solo song, written and composed by himself, and a Japanese remix of "結果咧" (Jie Guo Lie).

In addition, Hsueh wrote the song "Welcome" (歡迎光臨) by One Two Free from their self-titled album released on November 5, 2010.

Once again, the group won the Best Singing Group at the 22nd Golden Melody Awards in 2011.

On the other hand, Hsueh contributed the lyrics of "Love Faith Live" (說愛就愛) by Vanness Wu in C'est La V album released on July 15, 2011. During this year, he also appeared in television series that include Pearls of Love, Office Girls, and Love SOS consecutively.

His acting career continued the next year with Touch of the Light film and Ti Amo Chocolate television series with Vanness Wu, Joanne Tseng, and Wang Zi. He also contributed the song "Extras" (臨時演員) for the series' soundtrack.

On April 27, 2012, Da Mouth released their fourth album, "流感" (ˋinfluəns). The album has twelve songs, in which ten are written by Hsueh. Additionally, he wrote the song "SpeXial"	by a boygroup with the same name and album released on December 7, 2012.

Hsueh starred in the television series, Love Around after filming the King Flower drama series.

Personal life
In an interview in December 2021, Hsueh acknowledged that he has been in a relationship with a non-celebrity for 8 years and counting.

Filmography

Film

Television series

Television hosting

Music video appearances

Discography

Compositions

As lyricist

As composer

Collaborations

Soundtrack contributions

Awards and nominations

References

External links

 
 
 
 

1983 births
Living people
Fu Jen Catholic University alumni
Taiwanese male singers
Taiwanese rappers
Taiwanese singer-songwriters
Taiwanese male television actors
21st-century Taiwanese male actors
21st-century Taiwanese male singers
Taiwanese television presenters
Taiwanese male film actors
21st-century Taiwanese musicians
Male actors from Kaohsiung